John Cawse (25 December 1778 – 19 January 1862) was a British painter and caricaturist.

Life
He was born on 25 December 1778, the  son of Charles Woodruffe Cawse and his wife Mary, of Little Prescott Street, Whitechapel. His father described himself in his will as a "Staymaker and Dealer in Whale Fins".

Early in his career he was employed to draw caricatures by the print publisher SW Fores. He exhibited  at the Royal Academy from 1802, showing mostly portraits, but also some paintings of horses and,  from the early 1830s, a few  historical pictures. Between 1807 and 1845 he exhibited at the British Institution, predominantly showing literary and historical subjects, including scenes from the works of Shakespeare and Walter Scott. His portrait of the clown Joseph Grimaldi is in the collection of the National Portrait Gallery
 and his 1826 painting of Carl Maria von Weber is in that of the Royal College of Music.

He is best remembered for his book The  Art of Painting Portraits, Landscapes, Animals, Draperies, &c., in oil colours, published in 1840. He was an amateur musician who, unusually for the time, played the antiquated viola da gamba (i.e. the bass viol); an instrument he once owned is in the Victoria and Albert Museum.

Family
He married Mary Fraser; two of their daughters, Mary and Harriet Cawse,  became opera singers; another, Clarissa Sabina, was a miniature painter

Gallery

References

Sources

External links
John Cawse (British Museum Bio)

Year of birth unknown
1862 deaths
19th-century English painters
English male painters
1778 births
19th-century English male artists